NGC 4343 is an unbarred spiral galaxy in the constellation Virgo. It was discovered by the astronomer William Herschel on April 13, 1784. At a distance of 80 million light-years (25 Mpc), it is located in the Virgo Cluster. It contains an active galactic nucleus.

Gallery

References

External links 

Virgo Cluster
Virgo (constellation)
4343
Unbarred spiral galaxies
Active galaxies
7465
40251